William Salyers is an American actor. He is perhaps best known for his vocal performances, such as Reverend Putty on Moral Orel, Rigby on Regular Show and Otto Octavius / Doctor Octopus in the 2018 video game Spider-Man.

Biography
Salyers grew up in Pawhuska, Oklahoma and graduated from Pawhuska High School in 1982. He is known as the voice of Rigby on Regular Show, Reverend Putty and Mr. Littler on Moral Orel and Otto Octavius / Doctor Octopus in the video game Spider-Man. As of 2021, he also voices Hoffman in Back 4 Blood. He has also had roles in the film Bedazzled and the television series Judging Amy.

Filmography

Film

Television

Video games

References

External links
 
 

Living people
American male film actors
American male television actors
American male video game actors
American male voice actors
20th-century American male actors
21st-century American male actors
Year of birth missing (living people)